"The world wonders" is a phrase which rose to notoriety following its use during World War II when it appeared as part of a decoded message sent by Fleet Admiral Chester Nimitz, Commander in Chief, U.S. Pacific Fleet, to Admiral William Halsey Jr. at the height of the Battle of Leyte Gulf on October 25, 1944. The words, intended to be without meaning, were added as security padding in an encrypted message to hinder Japanese attempts at cryptanalysis, but were mistakenly included in the decoded text given to Halsey. Halsey interpreted the phrase as a harsh and sarcastic rebuke, and as a consequence dropped his futile pursuit of a decoy Japanese carrier task force, and, belatedly, reversed some of his ships in a fruitless effort to aid United States forces in the Battle off Samar.

Encryption strategy
Encryption cyphers can be defeated when easily guessed common patterns are recognized in the messages.  Messages typically have common intros and salutations such as "Dear" and "Sincerely" which can lead to the defeat of the cypher.  To remove common phrases from the start and the end, in World War II the US Navy would add unique non-relevant padding phrases separated from the main text by a word of two characters.  The padding would be added before encoding and stripped after decoding.  For example, a simple message such as "Halsey: Come home. - CINPAC" might become "Road less taken nn Halsey: Come home. - CINPAC rr bacon and eggs" during encrypted transmission.

Background

On October 20, 1944, United States troops invaded the island of Leyte as part of a strategy aimed at isolating Japan from the resource-rich territory it had occupied in South East Asia, and in particular depriving its forces and industry of vital oil supplies. The Imperial Japanese Navy (IJN) mobilized nearly all of its remaining major naval vessels in an attempt to defeat the Allied invasion. In the ensuing Battle of Leyte Gulf the Japanese intended to use ships commanded by Vice-Admiral Jisaburō Ozawa, "Northern Force", to lure the main American covering forces away from Leyte, thus allowing the main IJN forces, "Southern Force" and "Center Force", led by the 18-inch gunned super-battleship Yamato, the largest and most powerful ship afloat, to attack the invasion force in a pincer movement.

Halsey, in command of the mobile naval forces covering the invasion's northern flank, fell for the ruse, and convinced that Northern Force constituted the main Japanese threat, proceeded northward in pursuit with the carriers of 3rd Fleet and a powerful force of battleships, designated Task Force 34. This left the landing beaches covered only by sixteen escort carriers with about 450 aircraft from the 7th Fleet. On the morning of the 25th a strong Japanese force of battleships slipped through the San Bernardino Strait headed toward the American landing forces, prompting their commander, Admiral Thomas C. Kinkaid, to send a desperate plaintext message asking for support.

Nimitz's message
When Nimitz, at CINCPAC headquarters in Hawaii, saw Kinkaid's plea for help he sent a message to Halsey, simply asking for the current location of Task Force 34, which due to a previous misunderstanding, was unclear:

With the addition of metadata including routing and classification information, as well as the padding at the head and tail, the entire plaintext message to be encoded and transmitted to Halsey was:

U.S. Navy procedure called for the padding to be added to the start and end of the message, which were vulnerable to cryptanalysis due to the use of common phrases and words (such as "Yours sincerely") in those sections. The words chosen for padding should have been obviously irrelevant to the actual message, however Nimitz's enciphering clerk used a phrase that "[just] popped into my head". Historians note similarity to Lord Tennyson's poem "The Charge of the Light Brigade" about the eponymous battle, which was also fought on October 25 (of 1854), as the poem twice contains the phrase "All the world wonder’d".
 
While decrypting and transcribing the message, Halsey's radio officer properly removed the leading phrase, but the trailing phrase looked appropriate and he seems to have thought it was intended and so left it in before passing it on to Halsey, who read it as:

The structure tagging (the 'RR's) should have made clear that the phrase was in fact padding.  In all the ships and stations that received the message, only the decoder on Halsey's flagship, failed to delete both padding phrases.

Consequences
The message (and its trailing padding) became infamous, and created some ill feeling, since it appeared to be a harsh criticism by Nimitz of Halsey's decision to pursue the decoy carriers and leave the landings uncovered. "I was stunned as if I had been struck in the face", Halsey later recalled. "The paper rattled in my hands, I snatched off my cap, threw it on the deck, and shouted something I am ashamed to remember", letting out an anguished sob. RADM Robert Carney, Halsey's chief of staff (who had argued strongly in favor of pursuing the carriers), witnessed Halsey's emotional outburst and reportedly grabbed him by the shoulders and shook him, shouting, "Stop it! What the hell's the matter with you? Pull yourself together!" Recognizing his failure, Halsey ordered his fleet south, however the chase north had exhausted the fuel of his light escorts and more time was wasted refueling while Taffy 3 (Task Unit 77.4.3, commanded by Rear Admiral Clifton Sprague) was fighting for its life.  Halsey returned to Samar with his two fastest battleships, three light cruisers and eight destroyers, but he arrived too late to have any impact on the battle.

Notes

Sources

References

History of cryptography
Battle of Leyte Gulf
Naval signals
English phrases
Political quotes
Quotations from military
1940s neologisms